The Satmahal Prasada ("seven-story tower") is a 12th century step pyramid in the northeast corner of the archaeological complex of Polonnaruwa in Sri Lanka. It is believed to be a stupa because it is in a Buddhist environment. It is unique in the area, of unknown builder and purpose. It is often compared to the stupa at Wat Kukut in Lamphun in Thailand and to the Buddhist architecture of Cambodia.

According to the Mahavamsa, King Parakramabahu I the Great (1123-1186) built a seven-story tower at Polonnaruwa, but there is no certainty that he refers to this one.

It is made of brick and a layer of plaster. It has seven floors, although the seventh only barely remains. It has a square plan, with a lateral staircase. It presents the same decoration on its four sides. On the ground floor, there is a false entrance. On the upper floors, there is a sculpture at the centre of each wall, surrounded by an arch and holes for anchoring a niche or a similar structure.

It has been related to the pyre of Hephaestion, built in the 4th century BC by Alexander the Great in Babylon to honour that general.

References 

Buildings and structures in Polonnaruwa
Stupas in Sri Lanka
Pyramids in Asia